Asa Faulkner (July 16, 1802 - July 29, 1886) was an American businessman and politician. He served in the Tennessee House of Representatives and the Tennessee Senate.

Early life
Asa Faulkner was born on July 16, 1802, in Edgefield County, South Carolina. His father was Dr. Archibald Faulkner and his mother, Rebecca Burkhalter. His father was of English descent, a fourth-generation Marylander. His mother was of German Quaker descent. His parents settled in Warren County, Tennessee when he was 6.

Career
Faulkner began his career by working for a woollen mill from 1812 to 1830, when he built his own. He also acquired a cotton gin and built a dam, and became wealthy by the 1840s. Faulkner sold "Faulkner Jeans." He was "the nestor of all of Warren County's manufacturing interests, and spent all his long life in founding, nourishing and sustaining them."

Faulkner joined the Whig Party. During the American Civil War, he supported the Union Army. He served as a member of the Tennessee House of Representatives from 1865 to 1866, and as a member of the Tennessee Senate from 1869 to 1871.

Death
Faulkner first married Annis Wolfe; he later remarried twice, to Sally Reynolds, and Martha Ann Martin. He had 19 children, and resided at Falconhurst in McMinnville.

Faulkner died on July 29, 1886, in McMinnville, Tennessee. His funeral was conducted by Presbyterian minister George Tucker Stainback.

References

1802 births
1886 deaths
American people of German descent
People from McMinnville, Tennessee
Businesspeople from Tennessee
Members of the Tennessee House of Representatives
Tennessee state senators
19th-century American politicians
19th-century American businesspeople